Neobirsteiniamysis is a mysid crustacean genus of the subfamily Boreomysinae of the family Mysidae. Some of the largest mysids. Exclusively deep water. Cosmopolitan. 2 species.

Description
The eyes are lacking pigmentation, concave laterally, with the
microfibrous microstructures on the concave surface. The telson lateral margins are as wide as or wider than the anterion part of the telson. The statocyst is poorly developed.

Taxonomy
Type species of the genus is Petalophthalmus inermis Willemoes-Suhm, 1874. 
The name comes from the neo- (Greek new) and Birsteiniamysis (the unavailable genus-name, replaced by Neobirsteiniamysis).

Classification
Includes 2 species:

Neobirsteiniamysis inermis (Willemoes-Suhm, 1874) 
Neobirsteiniamysis caeca (Birstein et Tchindonova, 1958)

References

Mysida
Crustaceans described in 2020